Katherine Julianne Kuchenbecker is an American researcher in haptic technology and robot-assisted surgery, and a former high school and college volleyball player. She is director of the Haptic Intelligence department at the Max Planck Institute for Intelligent Systems in Germany.

Education and career
Kuchenbecker grew up in Southern California, and played volleyball in high school for the Brentwood School Eagles, participating in two state championships. She was educated in mechanical engineering at Stanford University, where her parents also both had gone. As an undergraduate, she played on the varsity volleyball team from 1996 to 1998, which had two national championship wins. At Stanford, she earned a bachelor's degree in 2000, a master's degree in 2002, and a Ph.D. in 2006. Her dissertation, Characterizing and Controlling the High-Frequency Dynamics of Haptic Interfaces, was supervised by Günter Niemeyer.

After postdoctoral research at Johns Hopkins University, she joined the faculty of the University of Pennsylvania Department of Mechanical Engineering and Applied Mechanics as Skirkanich Assistant Professor of Innovation in 2007. She was tenured as an associate professor in 2013, and named to the Class of 1940 Bicentennial Endowed Term Chair in 2015.

She moved to the  Max Planck Institute for Intelligent Systems in 2017.

Recognition
In 2011, Popular Science named her to their "Brilliant 10" of 2010, for her work on haptics, including a haptic video-gaming vest. Kuchenbecker was named an IEEE Fellow in 2022, "for contributions to interactive haptic systems and robotic touch perception".

References

External links

Home page

Year of birth missing (living people)
Living people
American mechanical engineers
American women engineers
American roboticists
Women roboticists
Stanford University alumni
University of Pennsylvania faculty
Fellow Members of the IEEE